Monika Forstinger (born 15 July 1963) is an Austrian businesswoman and former politician associated with the Freedom Party of Austria (FPÖ).

Life 

Forstinger was born in Schwanenstadt, Upper Austria, in 1963. She studied at the University of Natural Resources and Life Sciences, Vienna (BOKU) and the Johannes Kepler University Linz, graduating in 1988 and finishing a doctorate in 1997. She has one son, born  2005.

She became Minister for Transport, Innovation and Technology in the first Schüssel government on 11 November 2000. Forstinger was repeatedly criticised in this position, for example for issuing a flawed telephone number regulation which was rescinded almost immediately. She resigned in February 2002 after 15 months in office.

After leaving politics, Forstinger went to study in France and founded a consultancy firm specialising in risk management. This caused controversy in 2003 when her company received a contract from the state-owned Austrian Federal Railways (ÖBB). In February 2018 she was appointed to the ÖBB supervisory board. In the same year, she became a member of the university council at the BOKU.

References

External links 
 

1963 births
Living people
People from Vöcklabruck District
Freedom Party of Austria politicians
Government ministers of Austria
Women government ministers of Austria
21st-century Austrian businesswomen
21st-century Austrian businesspeople
20th-century Austrian politicians
20th-century Austrian women politicians
21st-century Austrian politicians
21st-century Austrian women politicians
University of Natural Resources and Life Sciences, Vienna alumni
Johannes Kepler University Linz alumni